Sant Vicenç or Sant Vicent (Catalan for Saint Vincent) may refer to:

Sant Vicenç de Castellet, municipality in the comarca of Bages
Sant Vicenç de Montalt, municipality in the comarca of Maresme
Sant Vicenç de Torelló, municipality in the comarca of Osona
Sant Vicenç dels Horts, municipality in the comarca of the Baix Llobregat
Sant Vicent del Raspeig, municipality in the province of Alicante, Spain
Sant Vicent de sa Cala, hamlet in the Spanish island of Ibiza

See also
Cala Sant Vicenç (disambiguation)